It's Gonna Work Out Fine is a studio album released by Ike & Tina Turner on Sue Records in 1963. It is their fourth album on the Sue label and the fifth associated with Ike and Tina, including the instrumental album Dance with Ike & Tina Turner's Kings of Rhythm. The title track and "Poor Fool" were hit singles in 1961, and both released on the 1962 album Dynamite!. The record "It's Gonna Work Out Fine" earned Ike & Tina Turner their first Grammy nomination.

Critical reception 
Cash Box (August 3, 1963):Ike & Tina Turner tag this new LP romp on Sue after a while-back hit called, "It's Gonna Work Out Fine," and include eleven other r&b biggies of recent vintage. Most of the tunes here are up- tempo and the duo belts them out with unabashed good spirits. Jumping off with "Gonna Find Me A Substitute, "the pair also includes "Poor Fool" and "I'm Gonna Cut You Loose." The package looms as a moneymaker in the r&b markets.
Reviewing the album for AllMusic, Stephen Thomas Erlewine wrote: This period of their discography is marked by burning early R&B fused with the same fireball energy of the also quickly developing rock & roll culture. Things slow down only slightly with the soulful title track and the swanky 'Why Should I,' but the energy is on ten for most of the set.

Track listing
All songs written by Ike Turner, except where noted.

References 

1963 albums
Ike & Tina Turner albums
Sue Records albums
Rhythm and blues albums by American artists